André Schultz (born 16 July 1988) is a Brazilian swimmer.

Trained with Bob Bowman, coach of American swimmer Michael Phelps, at the University of Michigan. He is a childhood friend of César Cielo.

Participated at the 2006 Pan Pacific Swimming Championships, where he finished 6th in the 4×200-metre freestyle, 13th in the 200-metre individual medley, 14th in the 200-metre backstroke  and 31st in the 200-metre freestyle.

At the 2010 Pan Pacific Swimming Championships, Schultz finished 5th in the 4×200-metre freestyle  14th in the 200-metre backstroke, and 15th in the 200-metre freestyle. He also finished 12th in the 200-metre individual medley heats, but did not swim the final 

He joined the Brazilian national delegation who attended the 2011 World Aquatics Championships in Shanghai, China, where he finished 14th in the 4×200-metre freestyle.

At the 2011 Pan American Games in Guadalajara, he came in 7th place in 200-metre freestyle, and won the silver medal at the 4×200-metre freestyle.

References

External links 
 

1988 births
Living people
Brazilian male backstroke swimmers
Brazilian male freestyle swimmers
Brazilian male medley swimmers
People from Santa Bárbara d'Oeste
Pan American Games medalists in swimming
Pan American Games silver medalists for Brazil
Swimmers at the 2011 Pan American Games
Medalists at the 2011 Pan American Games
Sportspeople from São Paulo (state)
21st-century Brazilian people